The white-throated spadebill (Platyrinchus mystaceus) is a tiny passerine bird in the tyrant flycatcher family. It lives in the tropical Americas.

Description

The large head is distinctively marked, with a long yellowish supercilium, blackish ear coverts, yellow eyering, and a black stripe down each side of the neck. The crown has a concealed yellow crest, which is erected as a fan by the singing male. The upperparts are dark olive brown, and the underparts are buff apart from the white throat. The bill is black above and brown below, and is very broad and flat, hence the English and scientific names "spadebill" and Platyrinchus.

Sexes are similar, other than the female having a smaller crown patch, but young birds are brighter and ruddier above, lack the crown patch, and have a grey throat and breast shading to a whitish belly. They are not particularly vocal but have a sharp  chweet call.

The subspecies Platyrinchus mystaceus insularis occurs only in Trinidad, Tobago and in Venezuela, other forms differing in the brightness of the underparts or the crown colour. The taxonomy of this species is uncertain, with some dubious subspecies, but also the possibility that what is usually treated as the white-throated spadebill consists of more than one species.

Distribution and ecology
The white-throated spadebill breeds from Costa Rica through South America to western Ecuador,  Brazil, and northeastern Argentina. It also occurs on both Trinidad and Tobago. This bird was recently found to be far more common on the Amazonian slope of the Colombian Cordillera Oriental than it was believed in the 20th century. It is not rare in its wide range, and thus not considered a threatened species by the IUCN.

This species is found in wet hill forests and will to some extent use secondary forest and other disturbed habitat. It likes habitat with thick, tangled undergrowth and medium-sized trees with a canopy height of  such as Elaeagia (Rubiaceae) and Hieronyma oblonga (Phyllanthaceae), overgrown with epiphytes and hemiepiphytes (e.g. Clusiaceae).

White-throated spadebills are solitary active birds, difficult to see as they move rapidly through the undergrowth in search of small arthropods, their mainstay food. These are taken with a sudden upward-darting sally flight and audible bill-snap from under the foliage, or less often from mid-air. This species occasionally joins mixed-species feeding flocks.

The deep cup nest is made of dead grass and plant fibres and placed low in a sapling. The typical clutch is two yellow-tinged white eggs with a rufous wreath.

Notes

References
 de A. Gabriel, Vagner & Pizo, Marco A. (2005): Foraging behavior of tyrant flycatchers (Aves, Tyrannidae) in Brazil. Revista Brasileira de Zoologia 22(4): 1072–1077 [English with Portuguese abstract].  PDF fulltext
 ffrench, Richard; O'Neill, John Patton & Eckelberry, Don R. (1991): A guide to the birds of Trinidad and Tobago (2nd edition). Comstock Publishing, Ithaca, N.Y.. 
 Hilty, Steven L. (2003): Birds of Venezuela. Christopher Helm, London. 
 Machado, C.G. (1999): A composição dos bandos mistos de aves na Mata Atlântica da Serra de Paranapiacaba, no sudeste brasileiro [Mixed flocks of birds in Atlantic Rain Forest in Serra de Paranapiacaba, southeastern Brazil]. Revista Brasileira de Biologia 59(1): 75-85 [Portuguese with English abstract].  PDF fulltext
 Stiles, F. Gary & Skutch, Alexander Frank (1989): A guide to the birds of Costa Rica. Comistock, Ithaca. 
 Salaman, Paul G.W.; Stiles, F. Gary; Bohórquez, Clara Isabel; Álvarez-R., Mauricio; Umaña, Ana María; Donegan, Thomas M. & Cuervo, Andrés M. (2002): New and noteworthy bird records from the east slope of the Andes of Colombia. Caldasia 24(1): 157-189 [English with Spanish abstract]. PDF fulltext

white-throated spadebill
Birds of Costa Rica
Birds of Panama
Birds of South America
white-throated spadebill
white-throated spadebill